The 1938 Northwestern Wildcats team represented Northwestern University during the 1938 Big Ten Conference football season. In their fifth year under head coach Pappy Waldorf, the Wildcats compiled a 4–2–2 record (2–1–2 against Big Ten Conference opponents) and finished in fourth place in the Big Ten Conference.

Schedule

References

Northwestern
Northwestern Wildcats football seasons
Northwestern Wildcats football